Mithila is a proposed state in India, comprising the Maithili speaking region of Bihar and Jharkhand. The Maithili language has own traditional script, known as Mithilakshar. It is part of the historical Mithila region.
The proposed state will also include  Whole Angika and Bajjika speaking districts which are considered to be dialects of Maithili. What will be the capital city of Mithila, India is still to be decided. Historically the capital cities of Mithila have shifted between Janakpur (Nepal), Vaishali, Simraungadh (Nepal), Rajnagar (Madhubani) and Darbhanga to now Begusarai.

There was also a movement in the Maithili speaking areas of Nepal for a separate state which ended in 2015, after Constitution of Nepal (2015) ensured it in form of province two.

History

Dr Laksman Jha and Others demanded a Mithila state shortly after independence and the former Chief Minister of Bihar, Jagannath Mishra has also expressed support for the creation of the state.

Various organisations have been formed that demand the formation of a state including the Maithil Mahasabha and the Mithilanchal Vikash Congress the former received support from Raj Darbhanga.
Various demonstrations have taken place demanding a Mithila state with a major protest taking place in Delhi in 2009 organised by the Akhil Bharatiya Mithila Rajya Sangharsh Samiti.

Political support

Mithila Rajya Nirman Sena

 Senior BJP leader, Rangnath Thakur, chairman and Founding member of Mithila Rajya Nirman Sena, has organised public rallies supporting Mithila.
Mithila Rajya Nirman Sena also did a Sankalp yatra under his leadership in 2017 and 2021 to create awareness and support for the movement

Bharatiya Janata Party

 Former BJP MP Kirti Azad from Darbhanga (Current Congress leader) has organised multiple dharnas and protests in support of Mithila. He has also launched a signature campaign in Mithila aiming to raise awareness.
 Senior BJP leader, Tarakant Jha, former chairman of Bihar Legislative Council, has organised public rallies supporting Mithila.

Janata Dal (United)

 In November 2011, Bihar Chief Minister Nitish Kumar also extended his support for the statehood of Mithila.
 Shravan Chaudhary, JDU state president, has openly supported the demand for the statehood of Mithila.

Rashtriya Janata Dal

Rabri Devi, former CM of Bihar, has always favoured the creation of a separate Mithila state.

Justification for Separation 

The demand for separate Mithila state has been there since creation of State of Bihar in 1912. 
There is marked cultural difference between North and South of Ganges.
The problems of Mithila region are different from rest of Bihar.
Maithili the language of the region has not been properly recognised. The 8th schedule of the Constitution of India includes the recognition of the 22 languages including Maithili (but in Devnagari Script). In Bihar Maithili is yet receive any official status.

Challenges

Mithila is a poor and flood-prone region dependent on subsistence agriculture, leading to doubts over its economically feasibility as a separate state.

The demand for a separate Mithila stems mostly from Darbhanga-Madhubani region, with marginal support from Tirhut and Seemanchal, and virtually no support from Angika speaking Bhagalpur-Munger.

See also
 Mithila, Nepal
 Maithili language
 Maithili literature
 Maithil
 Maithili Music
 Mithila Painting
 Mithila Makhana
 Mithila (region)
 Saharsa
 Darbhanga
 Maithili (disambiguation)

References

 
Ancient Indian cities
Historical Indian regions
Proposed states and union territories of India
Former capital cities in India